Lee Won-jong (born January 1, 1966) is a South Korean actor.

Filmography

Film

Television series

Variety shows

Theater
Blind (2010)
The Masked Hut Murder Case (2022) - Nobuhiko

Awards
2002 SBS Drama Awards: Best Supporting Actor (Rustic Period)
2006 KBS Drama Awards: Best Actor in a One Act Drama/Special (Bad Story)
2007 SBS Drama Awards: Best Supporting Actor in a Miniseries (War of Money)
2008 KBS Drama Awards: Excellence Award, Actor in a Weekly Drama (King Sejong the Great)

References

External links

1966 births
Living people
South Korean male film actors
South Korean male stage actors
South Korean male television actors
People from Buyeo County
People from South Chungcheong Province